Smart systems incorporate functions of sensing, actuation, and control in order to describe and analyze a situation, and make decisions based on the available data in a predictive or adaptive manner, thereby performing smart actions. In most cases the “smartness” of the system can be attributed to autonomous operation based on closed loop control, energy efficiency, and networking capabilities.

Characteristics
Smart systems typically consist of diverse components:
 Sensors for signal acquisition
 Elements transmitting the information to the command-and-control unit
 Command-and-control units that take decisions and give instructions based on the available information
 Components transmitting decisions and instructions
 Actuators that perform or trigger the required action

Development
A lot of smart systems evolved from microsystems. They combine technologies and components from microsystems technology (miniaturized electric, mechanical, optical, and fluidic devices) with  other disciplines like biology, chemistry, nanoscience, or cognitive sciences.

There are three generations of smart systems:
First-generation smart systems: object recognition devices, driver status monitoring, and multifunctional devices for minimally invasive surgery
 Second-generation smart systems: active miniaturized artificial organs like cochlear implants or artificial pancreas, advanced energy management systems, and environmental sensor networks
 Third-generation smart systems: combine technical “intelligence” and cognitive functions so that they can provide an interface between the virtual and the physical world

Challenges
A major challenge in smart systems technology is the integration of a multitude of diverse components, developed and produced in very different technologies and materials. Focus is on the design and manufacturing of completely new marketable products and services for specialized applications (e.g., in medical technologies), and for mass market applications (e.g., in the automotive industries).

In an industrial context, and when emphasizing the combination of components with the aim of merging their functional and technical abilities into an interoperable system, the term "smart systems integration" is used. This term reflects the industrial requirement and particular challenge of integrating different technologies, component sizes, and materials into one system.

The systems approach calls for integrated design and manufacturing and has to bring together interdisciplinary technological approaches and solutions (converging technologies). Manufacturing companies as well as research institutes therefore face challenges in terms of specialized technological knowhow, skilled labor, design tools, and equipment needed for the research, design and manufacturing of integrated smart systems.

Applications area for smart systems
Smart systems address environmental, societal, and economic challenges like limited resources, climate change, population ageing, and globalization. They are for that reason increasingly used in a large number of sectors. Key sectors in this context are transportation, healthcare, energy, safety and security, logistics, ICT, and manufacturing.

Environment
In terms of environmental challenges, smart solutions for energy management and distribution, smart control of electrical drives, smart logistics, or energy-efficient facility management could, by 2020, reduce global emissions by 23%, with an equivalent of 9.2 Gt e.

Automotive sector
In the automotive sector, smart systems integration will be a key enabler for pre-crash systems and predictive driver assistance features to reach the goal of the Road Safety Action Plan to halve the number of traffic deaths by 2020. Furthermore, smart systems are considered fundamental for sustainable and energy-efficient mobility, e.g., hybrid and electric traction.

Internet of Things
Smart systems also considerably contribute to the development of the future Internet of Things, in that they provide smart functionality to everyday objects, e.g., to industrial goods in the supply chain, or to food products in the food supply chain. With the help of active RFID technology, wireless sensors, real-time sense and response capability, energy efficiency, as well as networking functionality, objects will become smart objects. These smart objects could support the elderly and the disabled. The close tracking and monitoring of food products could improve food supply and quality. Smart industrial goods could store information about their origin, destination, components, and use. And waste disposal could become a truly efficient individual recycling process.

Armatix developed a pistol that uses an RFID-active wristwatch to function.

Healthcare
In the healthcare sector, smart systems technology leads to better diagnostic tools, to better treatment and quality of life for patients by simultaneously reducing costs of public healthcare systems. Key developments in this sector are smart miniaturized devices and artificial organs like artificial pancreas or cochlear implants.

For example, Lab-on-a-chip devices have biochemical sensors that detect specific molecular markers in body fluids or tissue. They can include multiple functionalities such as sample taking, sample preparation, and sample pre-treatment, data processing, and storage, implantable systems which can be reabsorbed by the body after use, non-invasive sensors based on transdermal principles, or devices for responsive administration of medication. In healthcare, smart systems often operate autonomously and within networks, because those systems are able to provide real-time monitoring, diagnosis, interaction with other devices, and communication with the patient or physician.

See also
 Internet of Things
 Machine learning
 Microbotics
 RoboBee
 Smart grid
 Smart city
 Microelectromechanical systems

References

 Akhras, G., "Smart Materials and Smart Systems for the Future", Canadian Military Journal, 08/2000
 European Commission ICT Work Programme 2007-08 
 European Commission ICT Work Programme 2009-10 
 
 
 
 Meyer, G. et al.: Advanced Microsystems for Automotive Applications 2009 - Smart Systems for Safety, Sustainability and Comfort, Springer 2009
 Internet-of-Things in 2020 – A roadmap for the future, 2008 
 Strategy Paper “Smart Systems for the Full Electric Vehicle”, 2008 
 Varadan, V. K.: Handbook of Smart Systems and Materials, Inst Of Physics Pub, London 2005
 Wadhawan, V. K.: Smart Structures, Oxford University Press 2005

External links
 The European Technology Platform on Smart Systems Integration (EPoSS)
EPoSS Strategic Research Agenda 2017
Product Showcase Smart Systems Integrated® 
 Smart Systems Integration 2009 - European Conference and Exhibition
Smart Systems for Clean, Safe and Shared Road Vehicles – 22nd International Forum on Advanced Microsystems for Automotive Applications (AMAA 2018)

Systems engineering

el:Ευφυή υλικά